The 2019 Southern Conference baseball tournament was held from May 21 through 26 at Fluor Field at the West End in Greenville, South Carolina.  The annual event determined the conference champion of the Division I Southern Conference in college baseball.  The tournament winner, Mercer Bears, earned the league's bid to the 2019 NCAA Division I baseball tournament.  This was the last of 20 athletic championships held by the conference in the 2018–19 academic year.

The tournament was originally held from 1950-53, when the Southern Conference was a large conference composed of several small schools and several large schools, the latter of which would form the Atlantic Coast Conference after the 1953 season.  The event was re-established in 1984 and has been held every year since.  Western Carolina has claimed ten championships, the most of any school, with The Citadel close behind at eight tournament wins.  Furman and defending champion Samford are the only other current schools with multiple championships, having each won two.  East Tennessee State and VMI have never won a title, although they both returned to the conference in 2015 after over ten years in other conferences.  Mercer claimed the conference championship in its first ever appearance in 2015.

The tournament was played in Greenville, which has hosted six of the past ten events.

Seeding and format
All nine teams participated in the tournament, with the bottom two seeds playing a single-elimination play-in round. The remaining teams then played a double-elimination tournament.

Bracket

Play-In Round

Double-elimination round

Conference championship

References

Tournament
Southern Conference Baseball Tournament
SoCon baseball tournament
Southern Conference baseball tournament
Baseball competitions in Greenville, South Carolina
College baseball tournaments in South Carolina